North Kellyville is a suburb of Sydney, in the state of New South Wales, Australia. It is 37 kilometres north-west of the Sydney central business district in the local government area of The Hills Shire. It is part of the Hills District.

History 
North Kellyville was officially proclaimed a suburb on 29 June 2018.  Previously, it had been part of the older suburb of Kellyville.

Education 
Schools located in North Kellyville includes:

 North Kellyville Public School  (Public Primary School, 120 Hezlett Rd, North Kellyville).
 Hills Adventist College (Christian Primary & Secondary School, 4 Gum Nut Cl, North Kellyville NSW 2155).
 Our Lady of the Angels Primary School (Catholic Primary School, 1 Wellgate Ave, North Kellyville NSW 2155).
 Australian International Academy (Muslim Primary & Secondary School, 2 Foxall Rd, North Kellyville NSW 2155).

North Kellyville has the following public school catchment:

 Ironbark Ridge Public School (Public Primary School, Rouse Hill, NSW 2155).
 Rouse Hill High School (Public High School, Rouse Hill, NSW 2155).

Commercial Areas 
The main retail area is located at the junction of Withers and Hezlett Roads, with North Kellyville Square in this location. It features a Woolworths supermarket, BWS liquor store and various other speciality stores and services.

An Aldi supermarket and other specialty stores can be found at the North Village, at the corner of Hezlett and Beaton Roads.

Rouse Hill Town Centre is easily accessible by regular bus services.

Transport 

 The 615X Hillsbus service to the Sydney CBD via Kellyville, Baulkham Hills and the M2 runs during peak hour.
 The 605 Hillsbus service operates between Stringer Road in North Kellyville and Rouse Hill Town Centre 
The 601 Hillsbus service operates between Rouse Hill Station to Parramatta via Hills Showground
The 715 Hillsbus service operates between Rouse Hill Station to Seven Hills via Kellyville & Norwest

Places of worship 
Churches in the suburb are:

 Kellyville Seventh-day Adventist Church
 Our Lady of the Angels Catholic Church
 The Church in Sydney
 Open House Church of Christ

References

External links
 Suburb Changes – North Kellyville, Norwest & Bella Vista – Hills Shire

Suburbs of Sydney
The Hills Shire
Populated places established in 2018
2018 establishments in Australia